LGBT cruises are a rising phenomenon in LGBT culture and a growing trend in the LGBT tourism industry.

History 
As LGBT tourism began to expand more into the LGBT society as a new cultural phenomenon, LGBT cruises became one of the growing trends. Before the start of all-gay cruises, gay couples would go on predominantly straight cruises, then later on had small LGBT groups aboard on mainstream cruises. Now, the LGBT cruising phenomenon expanded its scale, resulting in the establishment of all-gay or all-lesbian cruises. It is contributing a great portion in the LGBT tourism, as the demand of gay and lesbian cruising companies and itineraries has been in a constant increase over the last 10 years.

Some of the major LGBT cruising companies were established in the 1990s. Currently, there are over 15 U.S. companies that specifically specialize in LGBT cruising and over 75 itineraries. The LGBT cruises are preferred by gays and lesbians of all ages, as can be seen in the variation of age groups, from 20s up to 60s, 70s, and even 80s. It is said by Rich Campbell, the president and chief executive of Atlantis Events, that the average age out of 2,000 passengers on one of the cruises was around 40.

Services & facilities 
LGBT cruising companies serve LGBT passengers on first-class cruises. LGBT cruises are international cruises, in which the passengers may visit 4 or 5 destinations abroad in about one week’s time. The cruises also provide personalized onboard assistance while visiting port cities, and also receive guidance on money exchange and anything else needed in traveling abroad.
 Additional entertainment/ venues/ events on LGBT cruises
 gay comedian performances
 leading cabaret performances
 special guest speakers
 costume parties
 toga parties
 dating/newlywed games
 disco and country dances

People on LGBT cruises and their behaviors

Customers 
Passengers allowed on LGBT cruises must be at least 18 years old. If guests are within the age of 18 to 21, they must travel with a passenger over 25 years old in the same cabin.

Single or couple, all gays and lesbians are welcomed to enjoy their journey on the cruises. There are few restrictions on customers depending on the types of cruises they want to join. For all-gay cruises, those are exclusively for gays, with only a small proportion of women and/or lesbians. On the other hand, if the cruises are lesbian-orientated, only lesbians can board them. For LGBT-friendly cruises, the passengers may be both LGBT and straight. The gay and lesbian family cruises allow LGBT parents to sail with their kids.

Customer behavior (reasons in choosing LGBT cruises) 
There are few reasons in which the LGBT travelers choose LGBT cruises. First, they have opportunities to spend their vacation in a more LGBT-friendly environment, as they consider being in the atmosphere as a more significant factor than the destinations. Second, LGBT can be themselves in LGBT cruises with suitable security, atmosphere, and camaraderie, because they find that it is different from their daily lives of feeling stressful and constrained by the heterosexual environment. Third, the LGBT travelers can make other LGBT friends during the vacation. Fourth, the staff are friendly, polite, respectful and welcoming to its LGBT passengers.

LGBT couples with children trend to join the LGBT cruises because being in a gay-friendly environment is an important factor to them. Since they have their children to care for, the homosexual parents would be conscious about how others treat their families as it could be effective on their children. Moreover, LGBT parents would actually consider the destinations of the cruises, in which the trip could be both family-friendly and gay-friendly.

It is said that LGBT cruises will become a bigger trend in the coming future as the homosexual marriage are legalized in many countries, such as Canada and the Netherlands and the United States of America.

Staff 
LGBT cruises’ staff members are responsible for organizing the events held on the cruises. They are trained to serve the LGBT passengers in a courteous and respectful way, just as in the same way as serving straight passengers.

Routes/Destinations 
There are various routes for LGBT travelers to choose from, as more gay travel companies and agencies are organizing LGBT cruises to build up LGBT tourism. Some of the itineraries would be like the heterosexual cruises, with its destinations being  just be the same like the normal one, which majority of tourists would choose when it comes to cruise holiday, like the Caribbeans. However, LGBT-friendly destinations are more welcomed by the LGBT travelers, which are called gay "hotspots", such as Mykonos or Ibiza in the Mediterranean. These areas are common destinations for homosexual travelers, especially during the summer. There are also cultural capitals like Barcelona, Venice, and Rome which are also popular, as these cities are filled with fabulous nightlife and delicate dining. Though the Caribbeans is a typical destination for most cruises, gay-friendly cities like the Dutch Antilles (Aruba, Bonaire and Curaçao) would be specifically preferred by LGBT travelers.

Price/Promotion strategies 
Comparing to the mainstream cruises, LGBT cruises’ price is more expensive. It may be due to the extra onboard parties and entertainers for the services and entertainment on the cruises. The main promotion strategy used by the cruise providers is the Internet. A home web page is used to give a general introduction, provide cruising schedules and make reservations. Some online networks are dedicated to connect the LGBT travelers to available businesses. The easy access of information and convenience benefit the customers.

Controversy surrounding the LGBT cruises 
LGBT cruise may associate and arouse some negative behaviors caused by drunk passengers. There are also problems when LGBT cruises port on the countries that are not generous or acceptable about homosexuality. For example, like the Caribbean government refused LGBT cruises to land on their islands in the late 1990s, and the unwillingness still exist to this day. In addition, some residents of ports may be unhappy when the LGBT travelers show physical affection in public. Such as in Roseau, Dominica, in 2012, 2 gay men on a cruise were arrested, while in a port.

See also
 LGBT Tourism
 LGBT Marketing
 Spartacus International Gay Guide
 Gaylocator

References 

Cruising (maritime)
LGBT tourism